Timi or TIMI may refer to:

Places
 Timi, a village in Cyprus

People
 Filippo Timi (born 1974), Italian actor and writer
 Timi Max Elšnik (born 1998), Slovenian footballer
 Timi Hansen, Danish bass player
 Timi Lahti (born 1990), Finnish footballer
 Timi Odusina (born 1999), English footballer
 Timi Sobowale (born 2002), Irish footballer
 Timi Yuro, stage name of American soul and R&B singer-songwriter Rosemary Timothy Yuro (1940-2004)
 Timi Zhuo (born 1981), Taiwanese singer

Other uses
 TIMI or Thrombolysis In Myocardial Infarction, a research organization with headquarters in Boston
 TIMI (Technology Independent Machine Interface), an IBM hardware abstraction layer
 TiMi Studios, a video game development studio

Lists of people by nickname